
The Climate Forecast System or coupled forecast system (both names abbreviated CFS) is a medium to long range numerical weather prediction and a climate model run by the National Centers for Environmental Prediction (NCEP) to bridge weather and climate timescales. Version 2 became operational as CFSv2 in 2011.

Overview
CFSv2 is run once daily at NCEP, at multiple time scales. The medium-range model forecasts in one-week intervals out to four weeks, while the longer-range scale forecasts on three-month moving averages out some nine months. The shorter scale has some overlap with the Global Forecast System, NAVGEM and FIM models (among several other medium-range models) that the US government runs for operational forecast purposes.

"Coupled" refers to the fact that the model couples atmospheric to oceanic modeling. Its forecasts are derived from a 16-member ensemble, with each member initialized on a lead of several days of conditions. The CFSv2 offers output that can be masked to suppress forecasts made with insufficient skill.

Among the variables made available to the public include precipitation and surface temperature (both of which are available both on a global spatial scale and a continental one), winds at 200 and 850 hectopascals (hPa), and heights at 500 hPa (all of which are available only at the global or hemispheric scale). Output is rendered as deviation from normal.

See also
 Model for prediction across scales (MPAS)
 Community Earth System Model (CESM)

References

External links
 CFS homepage
 CFS weekly forecast output
 CPC seasonal forecasts 
 NCDC data
 NOMADS data access

National Weather Service numerical models